Strikeforce: At the Mansion II was a mixed martial arts event held on September 20, 2008.  The event took place at the Playboy Mansion in Beverly Hills, California. In addition to the event, all guests were entitled to a top-shelf, open bar; buffet-style, gourmet dinner; and wine tasting party featuring the spirits of various California gold medal wineries.

Results

Fighter payroll
Purse amounts were provided by the California State Athletic Commission, and include amounts for show and win. The figures do not include any undisclosed bonuses:

Kazuo Misaki ($1,400/win bonus was undisclosed) def. Joe Riggs ($20,000)
Josh Thomson $40,000 ($20,000 + $20,000 win bonus) def. Ashe Bowman ($2,000)
Terry Martin ($10,000) def. Cory Devela ($10,000)
Mitsuhiro Ishida ($1,400/win bonus was undisclosed) def. Justin Wilcox ($5,000)
Trevor Prangley ($40,000) def. Anthony Ruiz ($6,000)
Luke Stewart ($8,000) def. Jesse Juarez ($2,000)
Eric Lawson ($6,000/win bonus was $500) def. Kenneth Seagrist ($2,000)
Brandon Magana ($2,000) def. Brandon Thatch ($2,000)
Jesse Gillespie ($2,000/win bonus was $1,000) def. Dave Martin ($1,000)

Total Disclosed fighter payroll:$159,000

See also 
 Strikeforce (mixed martial arts)
 List of Strikeforce champions
 List of Strikeforce events
 2008 in Strikeforce

References

External links
Strikeforce Homepage

At the Mansion II
2008 in mixed martial arts
Mixed martial arts in Los Angeles
2008 in sports in California